Garofano rosso is the fifth studio album by Italian progressive rock band Banco del Mutuo Soccorso. It is an instrumental soundtrack from the film with the same name.

Track listing

Personnel

 Rodolfo Maltese – Electric guitar, acoustic guitar, trumpet, French horn
 Pier Luigi Calderoni – drums, percussion, timpani
 Renato D'Angelo – Bass, contrabass, acoustic guitar
 Gianni Nocenzi – Piano, electric piano, synthesizer, clarinet
 Vittorio Nocenzi – Organ, synthesizer, violin, vibraphone

References

1976 albums
Banco del Mutuo Soccorso albums